Serrao or Serrão is an Italian and Portuguese surname respectively. Notable people with the surname include:

Carlos Serrao, American photographer
Francis Serrao (born 1959), Indian Roman Catholic bishop
Francisco Serrão (died 1521), Portuguese explorer
Giovanni Andrea Serrao (1731–1799), Italian intellectual and churchman
João Serrão (died 1521), Spanish navigator
Joaquim Veríssimo Serrão (born 1925), Portuguese historian
José Carlos Serrão (born 1950), Brazilian football manager and former player
Luella A. Varney Serrao (1865–1935), American sculptor
Manuel Serrão, Portuguese nobleman
Paolo Serrao (1830–1907), Italian composer
Priya Serrao (born 1992), Australian lawyer, policy adviser, beauty pageant titleholder, and Miss Universe Australia 2019

Italian-language surnames
Portuguese-language surnames